Fleetwood Town Football Club is an English professional football club, based in the town of Fleetwood in Lancashire. The club participates in League One, the third tier of English football.

History
The current club was officially established in 1997 but, in two previous incarnations, the club's history dates back to 1908. The original club, Fleetwood F.C., were champions of the Lancashire Combination in 1923–24. After almost sixty years as a Lancashire Combination club, they were made founder members of the Northern Premier League in 1968. After winning the Northern Premier League Cup in 1971, the club languished in the lower half of the table, finishing bottom for two successive seasons and folded in 1976 because of financial difficulties.

The club was re-established in 1977 as Fleetwood Town F.C.. Initially placed in Division One of the Cheshire League, they were moved in 1982 to the North West Counties League Division Two in its inaugural year, and promoted to Division One in 1984. They reached the final of the FA Vase in 1985, losing 3–1 to Halesowen Town in front of a 16,000 crowd at Wembley. The club was placed in Division One (second tier) of the Northern Premier League when the league established a second tier in 1987, becoming the inaugural Division One Champions in 1988. However, by 1996, this second club had also folded.

Re-formed in 1997 as Fleetwood Wanderers, the club was placed back in Division One of the North West Counties Football League (now the tenth tier of the English League system) and a sponsorship deal saw the club's name immediately changed to Fleetwood Freeport F.C.. The club was promoted to the Premier Division of the North West Counties League in 1999 and renamed Fleetwood Town F.C. in 2002. Successive promotions as North West Counties League champions in 2005 and Northern Premier League First Division runners-up in 2006 saw the club reach the Northern Premier League Premier Division. The 2007–08 season Fleetwood won the Northern Premier League, gaining promotion to the Conference North.

Fleetwood contested the play-offs in the second season in the Conference North, and after beating Droylsden on penalties in the semi-final Fleetwood won promotion to the Football Conference by beating Alfreton Town 2–1 in the final. For the next season the club made all of its players full-time professionals. The club spent most of the season in or near the play-off positions, eventually qualifying by finishing in fifth place. In the play-off semi-finals, against AFC Wimbledon, a new attendance record of 4,112 was set in the home leg, but Fleetwood lost both games with an 8–1 aggregate scoreline. Fleetwood's 2011–12 season was very successful. In the FA Cup they reached the Third Round for the first time. After beating Mansfield Town, Wycombe Wanderers, and Yeovil Town, they were drawn at home to local rivals Blackpool, but lost 5–1 to the Championship club, with Jamie Vardy scoring Fleetwood's only goal. In the league Fleetwood went on a 29-game unbeaten run and were declared champions with two games remaining, giving them promotion to the Football League for the first time.

The 2013–14 season was another successful one. Having been in and around the automatic promotion places all season and getting to the League Trophy area final, the club narrowly missed out on automatic promotion finishing in 4th place. After beating York City in the play-off semi-final, Fleetwood beat Burton Albion 1–0 from an Antoni Sarcevic free-kick in the play-off final at Wembley on 26 May to win promotion to League One for the first time.

Playing at the club's highest level the 2014–15 season was the club's most successful yet. After three games the club was top of the league for two games and apart from a couple of games remained in the top half of the league all season eventually finishing a very credible 10th place.

Key

Key to league record
 Level = Level of the league in the current league system
 Pld = Games played
 W = Games won
 D = Games drawn
 L = Games lost
 GF = Goals for
 GA = Goals against
 GD = Goals difference
 Pts = Points
 Position = Position in the final league table
 Top scorer and number of goals scored shown in bold when he was also top scorer for the division. Number of goals includes goals scored in play-offs.

Key to cup records
 Res = Final reached round
 Rec = Final club record in the form of wins-draws-losses
 PR = Preliminary round
 QR1 (2, etc.) = Qualifying Cup rounds
 G = Group stage
 R1 (2, etc.) = Proper Cup rounds
 QF = Quarter-finalists
 SF = Semi-finalists
 F = Finalists
 A (QF, SF, F) = Area quarter-, semi-, finalists
 W = Winners

Seasons

External links
 (1910–76 and 1993–96)
 (1997-2002)
(1978–93 and 2002-current)

References

English football club seasons